Thiago Araujo da Silva (born 22 June 1983) is a Brazilian football player currently playing for Comercial Futebol Clube (Ribeirão Preto).

Career

Early career
Thiago Silva was initially at Palmeiras, moving to J.Malucelli after 4 years at the club. He would then move between several clubs over the next 4 years, moving to 3 de Febrero, back to Palmeiras, to America Mineiro, to Atletico Mineiro, and then back to America Mineiro once more.

Debut season
In 2009, Silva moved first to Campeonato Brasileiro Série C side Clube Atlético Bragantino, then to Paulista Série A1 side Paysandu Sport Club, where he would make 2 league appearances for both clubs.

Return to Paraguay
For 2010, Thiago Silva returned to 3 de Febrero, now playing in the Paraguayan Primera División, where he made 16 appearances, scoring 2 goals.

Return to Brazil
For 2011, he joined Paulista A1 side Paulista FC, playing 3 times. He would then move to Anápolis Futebol Clube briefly, before moving to Pernambucano Série A1 side Central Sport Club, where he made 19 appearances, scoring 5 goals.

Japan
On 10 August 2012, Thiago Silva signed for J2 League side Matsumoto Yamaga FC, being given the number 10 shirt, previously worn by Michiaki Kakimoto. He left the club in 2013 after the club decided not to renew his contract, having not played a game all season.

Comercial
Having left Matsumoto, Thiago Silva signed for Campeonato Paulista Série A2 side Comercial. He made his debut on 23 January 2013, playing in a 1–1 draw against Rio Claro.

References

1983 births
Living people
Brazilian footballers
Association football midfielders
Sociedade Esportiva Palmeiras players
J. Malucelli Futebol players
Club Atlético 3 de Febrero players
América Futebol Clube (MG) players
Clube Atlético Mineiro players
Clube Atlético Bragantino players
Paysandu Sport Club players
Paulista Futebol Clube players
Anápolis Futebol Clube players
Central Sport Club players
Matsumoto Yamaga FC players
Comercial Futebol Clube (Ribeirão Preto) players
Paraguayan Primera División players
J2 League players
Brazilian expatriate footballers
Brazilian expatriate sportspeople in Paraguay
Brazilian expatriate sportspeople in Japan
Expatriate footballers in Paraguay
Expatriate footballers in Japan
People from São Bernardo do Campo
Footballers from São Paulo (state)